This is a list of seasons played by the senior football club from Ashford, Kent (Ashford United, Ashford Railway Works and Ashford Town) in English football since 1891.

Ashford United (1891-1906)
Ashford United were founded in 1891 - the union between South Eastern Rangers and Kentish Express FC. The team initially played at the Victoria Ground (behind the Victoria Hotel) and subsequently moved to Godinton Road, Ashford. They were founder members of the original Kent League and additionally the team played in the East Kent League and the 2nd Division of both the Thames & Medway Combination and the South Eastern League. The team folded owing to heavy debts during season 1906-07 after playing 10 matches and their record for the season was expunged.

Ashford United (First Team)

Ashford United 'A' Team

Ashford Railway Works (1907-1928)
The Ashford Railway Works football club was founded in 1907. They played their matches at the Railway Works Ground, off Newtown Road, Ashford. Many of its members were drawn from the ranks of skilled engineers from the Ashford railway works and led to the team acquiring the nickname the ‘Nuts and Bolts'. After the 1920s the team began to be known as simply Ashford. They played in the original East Kent League, Kent League (with significant success in Division 2 East) and also the Folkestone and District Senior League. The club folded in 1928.

Ashford Railway Works (First Team)

Ashford Railway Works Reserves

Ashford Town (1930-2010)
Founded in 1930 Ashford Town F.C. were elected to the Kent League. They began playing at the Railway Works ground and then moved to the newly acquired Essella Park ground. On the sale of that facility in 1987 they ground-shared for two years at Cheriton Road, Folkestone before returning to Ashford and the new purpose built Homelands stadium at Kingsnorth. The team were 1948-49 Kent League Champions and after that league disbanded in 1959 they joined the Southern League. As a result of the re-organisation of the structure of non-League football in 2004 the team was allocated to the Isthmian League. Owing to unpaid football debts the club was suspended by The Football Association from competition in 2010. As a result of a dispute between the club’s Directors it went into financial administration and the club was wound up.

Ashford Town (First Team)

Ashford Town Reserves

Ashford United (2011-    )

Ashford United (First Team)
Formed by one of the Directors of the former Ashford Town club, Ashford United was formed in 2011 and resurrected the name of the team from 1891-1907. The club began playing in the Kent Invicta League and after two seasons advanced to the Kent League which renamed itself as the Southern Counties East Football League. The team were promoted as SCEFL Champions to the Isthmian League in 2017.

Ashford United Reserves

Ashford United Thirds

Key

League Record
Pld = Played
W = Games won
D = Games drawn
L = Games lost
GF = Goals for
GA = Goals against
Pts = Points
Pos = Final position/rank

FA Cup
EP = Extra preliminary round
P = Preliminary round
Q1 = First qualifying round
Q2 = Second qualifying round
Q3 = Third qualifying round
Q4 = Fourth qualifying round
R1 = First round proper
R2 = Second round proper

'Other'
P = promoted
R = relegated
w = winner
ru = runner-up
sf = semi-finalist
See also each section for key to 'other'

References

Non-League Football matters

Football Club History Database

The Southern Counties East Football League

(formerly Jeff Trice's) Margate FC history website

The history of Dover football club

 Nuts and Bolts Archive, History of Ashford Town & Ashford United

Ashford United
Seasons